World's Most Wanted is a 2020 docuseries, exploring five of the world's most wanted criminals.

Episodes

Release 
World's Most Wanted was released on August 5, 2020, on Netflix.

References

External links 
 
 

2020s American documentary television series
2020 American television series debuts
English-language Netflix original programming
Netflix original documentary television series
True crime television series